Omega Flight is the name used by four teams of fictional characters with superpowers appearing in American comic books published by Marvel Comics. Omega Flight is one of the few Canadian teams published by an American comic book company. Omega Flight first appeared in the pages of Alpha Flight as a supervillain team. Some later  incarnations have been composed of heroes.

Publication history
The Omega Flight team assembled by Jerome Jaxon first appeared in Alpha Flight #11–13 (June–August 1984).

The team assembled by the Master first appeared in Alpha Flight #110–112 (July–September 1992).

The next team known as Omega Flight was a group of heroes. The team made their first appearance in the one-shot Civil War: The Initiative (April 2007) and moved on to their own series, Omega Flight #1–5.

The most recent team was a group of heroes assembled by Department H, who have only appeared in Avengers vol. 5, #9–10 (June 2013).

Fictional team biography

Jerry Jaxon's team
The name of Omega Flight is originally used by a group of super-villains assembled with the specific purpose of killing the original Alpha Flight, particularly its founder, the original Guardian.

Delphine Courtney, the robotic assistant to Jerry Jaxon, recruited superhuman operatives to join Omega Flight as part of Jaxon's revenge scheme against James McDonald Hudson.  Jaxon had been Hudson's boss and blamed Hudson for his dismissal.  All of Courtney's recruits had been members of the then disbanded Beta and Gamma Flights. It included:

 Delphine Courtney (MX39147) - Courtney is a robot with superhuman strength and durability, along with enhanced sight and hearing. She is destroyed by Madison Jeffries.
 Diamond Lil (Lillian Crawley) – Diamond Lil is a mutant with a bio-aura force field, giving her superhuman durability. She is killed in Selene's attack on Utopia.
 Flashback (Gardner Monroe) – Flashback is a mutant with the ability to bring future versions of himself into the present.
 Jerry Jaxon – Jaxon is a human who controls the Box robot as a member of the team. He is killed by feedback when Vindicator overloads the robot.
 Smart Alec (Alexander Thorne) – Smart Alec is a super-genius. He is killed when he looks into Shaman's pouch, destroying his mind.
 Wild Child (Kyle Gibney) – Wild Child is a mutant with superhuman speed, agility, reflexes and senses. He also has a healing factor, retractable claws and limited ability to communicate with animals. He is killed when Omega Red throws him into molten steel.

Master of the World's team
The second incarnation is organized by the Master of the World. Once again, the purpose of the team's creation is to destroy Alpha Flight. The membership includes:

 Bile (Tom Preston) – Bile has the ability to secrete viruses, giving him a deadly touch.
 Brain Drain (Werner Schmidt) – Brain Drain is a human that uses alien technology to control the minds of others.
 Miss Mass (Gillian Pritikin) – Miss Mass possesses superhuman strength and density.
 Sinew (William Knox) – Sinew has an appearance that resembles an animal, including a tail. He has enhanced physical abilities.
 Strongarm (Steve Caidin) – Strongarm is a human with cybernetically-enhanced right arm, granting him superhuman strength. 
 Tech-Noir (Gale Cameron) – Tech-Noir is a cyborg with the power of flight and rocket launchers in her wrists.

Initiative team

This team emerges from the aftermath of Marvel's Civil War crossover storyline.  The lineup includes elements of the original Canadian super-team Alpha Flight as well as other superheroes, mostly American superheroes on loan from S.H.I.E.L.D. thanks to Iron Man and the Initiative. The team roster was meant to include Arachne, Michael Pointer as the new Guardian, Sasquatch, U.S. Agent, Beta Ray Bill and Talisman, but changes to the story after Omega Flight was reduced to a limited series meant that the final two never actually joined the team.

Former Alpha Flight member Sasquatch acts as recruiter for the team. After his attempts at recruiting Talisman are initially rebuffed, Sasquatch is forced to battle the rampaging Wrecking Crew alone, and he is defeated. Upon learning of her friend's capture, Talisman accepts the offer to join Omega Flight, even for a temporary basis. As the Wrecking Crew carve a path of destruction towards Toronto, Talisman, driven by a series of mysterious visions,  joins up with U.S. Agent and Arachne in Ottawa, but not before lambasting Iron Man and blaming him for the supervillain crisis that has engulfed Canada. Somewhat concerned about the presence of Americans on a Canadian superhero team, Talisman reacts violently when she learns that Michael Pointer, the man who killed Alpha Flight as the Collective, has become the new Guardian.

Meanwhile, the Wrecking Crew (along with the captured Sasquatch) storm into the Royal Ontario Museum (ROM) in Toronto, drawn there by visions. Also present in the museum is Simon Walters, the human avatar of Beta Ray Bill, who has also been receiving the visions leading him to the ROM's exhibit on the Great Beasts. Opening a portal to the Realm of the Great Beasts, the Wrecking Crew is further empowered by Tanaraq, who also summons a horde of Surtur demons to aid the Crew in destroying the world. Spurred into action, Walters unveils himself as Beta Ray Bill and engages the villains, who ultimately prove too strong for the Korbinite warrior to handle.  As the Wrecking Crew and the Surtur demons spill out onto the streets of Toronto, Talisman, Arachne and U.S. Agent arrive to confront them. While Omega Flight is capable of holding off the villains and their demonic allies with the assistance of Beta Ray Bill, the situation takes a turn for the worse when Tanaraq possesses and empowers Sasquatch. The team is saved by the eleventh-hour intervention of Pointer, who devastates the ranks of demons and even throws away the Wrecking Crew, but refuses to kill the possessed Sasquatch even as his life is threatened by him.

With no other viable options left, Talisman uses the power of Shaman's medicine bag to exorcise Tanaraq's hold over Sasquatch and the Wrecking Crew, draining them of their newfound powers. Seizing the bag, Beta Ray Bill lures the demons back into the Realm of the Great Beasts  claiming he has been in worse situations before. Forcing Guardian to seal the portal behind him, he effectively sacrifices himself to save the planet. With Tanaraq's plot foiled and the Surtur demons locked away, Omega Flight is able to defeat the Wrecking Crew and finally bring them into S.H.I.E.L.D. custody.

After the battle, the team finally begins to establish itself as a functioning unit. Guardian is able to move past his guilt over his role in the Collective incident. U.S. Agent finally retrieves his genuine shield from the Purple Man, defeating the villain in the process, Sasquatch helps out with the reconstruction efforts in Toronto but afterwards is still guilt-ridden over what he did while possessed and disappears. Talisman retires from active duty to serve as her tribe's shaman. Arachne decides to remain with the team.  The series ends with Beta Ray Bill locked in eternal combat with the Surtur demons in the Realm of the Great Beasts, truly trapped in the nightmare plane, but uncaring for his seemingly hopeless situation. However, Bill escapes from his imprisonment and aids Thor against the Skrull invasion of Asgard.

Marvel Comics Presents follows up on the limited series with a story regarding Pointer's powers, and his adjustment to the Guardian suit.

U.S. Agent officially leaves the team in order to join the new team of Mighty Avengers, while Pointer adopts the alias Weapon Omega and joins Norman Osborn and Emma Frost's Dark X-Men team. Beta Ray Bill is currently in space. Arachne reappeared in Manhattan during the "Grim Hunt" storyline. Thus, this incarnation of Omega Flight appears to have been disbanded.

Department H's team
As part of the Marvel NOW! event, a new incarnation of Omega Flight appears under the control of Department H. It consists of Validator, Boxx, Kingdom and a Wendigo. Omega Flight is sent in by Department H to investigate one of the Origin Bomb sites left by Ex Nihilo in Regina, Canada. Validator is changed by the Origin Bomb site while the rest of the Omega Flight members are killed in action.

Collected editions

In other media
Omega Flight appears in Marvel Future Revolution. This version is an interdimensional organization that unites heroes from different realities to find a solution to the Convergence and protect Primary Earth.

See also
 Avengers: The Initiative
 List of Flight members

References

External links
 Omega Flight at Marvel.com
 Omega Flight (Jerome Jaxon's Team) at Marvel Wiki
 Omega Flight (Master of the World's Team) at Marvel Wiki
 Omega Flight (Heroes) at Marvel Wiki
 Omega Flight (Department H's Team) at Marvel Wiki
 AlphaFlight.net
 Mike Oeming Discusses His Omega Flight Plan, Newsarama, April 9, 2006
 Cleared for Take-Off: Michael Avon Oeming and Scott Kolins on Marvel Comics’ Omega Flight, Comics Bulletin, September 2, 2006
 Mid-Ohio-Con: Michael Avon Oeming Panel, Comics Continuum, November 25, 2006

Alpha Flight
X-Men supporting characters